Penwithick or Penwithick Stents is a village in Cornwall, England, United Kingdom. Whilst falling in a different civil parish Penwithick does have an electoral ward in its own name. The population at the census 2011 was 4,479

Penwithick has a small local shop which also has a sub post office, a social club as well as a premises selling fish & chips.

There are plans to build a new settlement Baal & West Carclaze south of the village as part of the St Austell and Clay Country Eco-town. This would include 1,800 to 2,500 homes. The plan was given outline approval in July 2009.

References

Villages in Cornwall